Ženje ( or , in older sources sometimes Žejne) is a small settlement in the hills above the right bank of the Sava River in the Municipality of Krško in eastern Slovenia. The area is part of the traditional region of Lower Carniola. It is now included in the Lower Sava Statistical Region.

References

External links
Ženje on Geopedia

Populated places in the Municipality of Krško